China Resources Petroleum Company Limited, was a subsidiary of China Resources (CRC), and was a major petroleum product company in China 1991–2007. CRC was created in 1991 and had operations throughout Southeast Asia and based in Hong Kong. CR Enterprises disposed Dongguan China Resources Petrochems to Sinopec at the end of 2005, the mainland petrochemical services in October 2006 and the business in Hong Kong to Sinopec in 2007.
 
CRC consisted of:
 CRC Petroleum
 CRC Chemical
 CRC LPG
 CRC Callony
 CRC PFS
 Oleochemicals

See also
 Energy in Hong Kong
 CRC Oil Storage Depot

References

Oil and gas companies of Hong Kong
Energy companies established in 1991
Non-renewable resource companies established in 1991
1991 establishments in Hong Kong